The 2007 BBL Champions Cup was the second edition of the super cup game in German basketball, and was played on October 2, 2007.

Match

References

BBL Champions Cup
Champions Cup